Paul Griffin (born 3 June 1971) is an Irish boxer. He competed in the men's featherweight event at the 1992 Summer Olympics.

References

External links
 

1971 births
Living people
Irish male boxers
Olympic boxers of Ireland
Boxers at the 1992 Summer Olympics
Place of birth missing (living people)
Featherweight boxers